Otraria was one of two s ordered by the Portuguese government, but taken over and completed for the  (Royal Italian Navy) during the 1930s. She played a minor role in the Spanish Civil War of 1936–1939 supporting the Spanish Nationalists.

Design and description
The Glauco-class submarines were improved versions of the preceding . They displaced  surfaced and  submerged. Their crew numbered 58 officers and enlisted men.

For surface running, the boats were powered by two  diesel engines, each driving one propeller shaft. When submerged each propeller was driven by a  electric motor. They could reach  on the surface and  underwater.

The boats were armed with eight internal  torpedo tubes, four each in the bow and stern for which they carried a total of 14 torpedoes. They were also armed with two  deck guns, one each fore and aft of the conning tower, for combat on the surface. Their anti-aircraft armament consisted of one or two  machine guns.

Construction and career
Otraria was laid down by CRDA in its Trieste shipyard. The submarine had initially been ordered in 1931, but was acquired by the Italians when Portugal cancelled the order. She was launched on 20 March 1935 and entered service in January 1936. During the Spanish Civil War she attempted to torpedo a Republican destroyer in Cartagena, but missed with the torpedo detonating against a mole. Otraria survived the Second World War and was discarded on 1 February 1948.

Notes

References

External links
 Otaria (1935) Marina Militare website

Glauco-class submarines
World War II submarines of Italy
1935 ships
Ships built by Cantieri Riuniti dell'Adriatico